Philomel Books is a children's literature imprint of Penguin Books USA. The imprint was founded by Ann Beneduce, who was succeeded as publisher by Patricia Lee Gauch.

Philomel publishes the series of children's books The Ranger's Apprentice by John Flanagan and the Alex Rider series by Anthony Horowitz. The imprint also published notable picture books including The Day the Crayons Quit and The Very Hungry Caterpillar.

References

External links

Children's book publishers
Book publishing companies based in New York City
Pearson plc